This is a list of notable Rosenwald Schools, from Texas to Virginia, from Florida to Oklahoma.  There once were 5,000 or so Rosenwald Schools in the United States, primarily serving Black Americans. At least 58 of these schools are listed on the U.S. National Register of Historic Places.
Notable examples include:

References

List
Rosenwald